Ronaldo Cisneros Morell (born 8 January 1997) is a Mexican professional footballer who plays as a forward for Liga MX club Guadalajara.

Early life
Ronaldo Cisneros Morell was born in Torreón, Coahuila, to Mario Cisneros. Mario named him Ronaldo because of the Brazilian football icon during the time, Ronaldo. Showing talent at a young age he caught the attention of a Santos Laguna youth recruiter.

Club career

Youth
Cisneros joined Santos youth academy in 2011. He continued through all the ranks from Santos Youth Academy successfully going through U-15, U-17, and U-20. He managed to become top scorer for the U-17 and U-20s squads. Portuguese coach Pedro Caixinha promoted Ronaldo to the first the team.

Santos Laguna
Cisneros made his professional debut in the Liga MX on October 24, 2014, in a 1–1 draw against Pumas UNAM. He scored a hat trick against Juárez in the Copa MX on September 13, 2017. After Santos began to struggle, Cisneros was not being considered in the first team as he was too young to take on big responsibilities and only played in the Copa MX and under-20s squad. His number was first 132, but a while after, it was changed to 97.

Guadalajara
On December 13, 2017, Cisneros was signed by Guadalajara. He scored his first Liga MX goal on his debut for the club on January 20, 2017, against Club Necaxa.

International career

Youth
Cisneros was called up to the under-20 squad which participated in the 2017 CONCACAF U-20 Championship. He went on to score 6 goals in only 5 appearances becoming one of the top scorers in the tournament. Cisneros was also called up to the 2017 FIFA U-20 World Cup and scored 2 goals in 5 appearances scoring against Vanuatu and Senegal.

In May 2019, Cisneros was called up by Jaime Lozano to participate in that year's Toulon Tournament, where Mexico finished third in the tournament.

Honours
Guadalajara
CONCACAF Champions League: 2018

Individual
CONCACAF Under-20 Championship Golden Boot: 2017
CONCACAF U-20 Championship Best XI: 2017

References

External links

Ronaldo Cisneros at Medio Tiempo
 

1997 births
Living people
Footballers from Coahuila
Mexican footballers
Sportspeople from Torreón
Association football forwards
Mexico under-20 international footballers
Santos Laguna footballers
C.D. Guadalajara footballers
Club Atlético Zacatepec players
Liga MX players
Atlanta United FC players
Major League Soccer players